Gay Su Pinnell (born June 28, 1944) is an American educational theorist and a professor emerita at the School of Teaching and Learning at Ohio State University. She is best known for her work with Irene Fountas on literacy and guided reading a whole language teaching framework which layed the groundwork for the Fountas and Pinnell reading levels.

Education 
Pinnell's parents were educators in Portales, New Mexico and Pinnell has an undergraduate degree from Eastern New Mexico University. In 1975, Pinnell earned her Ph.D. from Ohio State University where she worked on language in first grade students. In 2018, Lesley University awarded Pinnell an honorary doctorate to recognize her contributions to childhood literacy.

Career 
Working with Irene Fountas, Pinnell developed a whole language system of guided reading for teachers which assigns letters (A through Z, commonly known as the Fountas and Pinnell reading levels) to students based on their reading ability and comprehension. Their work is also known as leveled reading, and establishes guidelines to identify books for children by reading level. Pinnell's books include Guided Reading Good First Teaching for All Children that was reviewed by Harvard Educational Review, Literacy Quick Guide for pre-K to 8th grade,  and Matching Books to Readers that was reviewed by Education Review.

Pinnell also contributed financially to literacy programs for young children, including multiple contributions to Ohio State's Literacy Collaborative and she endowed the Mary Fried Endowed Clinical Professorship at Ohio State University in 2020. Eastern New Mexico University named her Philanthropist of the Year in 2019.

Selected publications

Awards 
Charles A. Dana Award for Pioneering Achievement in Education (1993)
Hall of Fame, International Reading Association (1999)
Alumni Medalist Award, Ohio State University Alumni Association (2016)
Inaugural winner of the Diane Lapp & James Flood Professional Collaborator Award, International Literacy Association (2018)

International Reading Association’s Albert J. Harris Award

References

External links
Fountas & Pinnell Literacy 
, May 22, 2018

Ohio State University alumni
Ohio State University faculty
American educational theorists
1944 births
Living people
Eastern New Mexico University alumni